The Referendums (Wales and Scotland) Act 1997 (c. 61) is an Act of the Parliament of the United Kingdom, which made legal provision for the holding of two non-binding referendums in both Scotland on the establishment of a democratically elected Scottish Parliament with tax-varying powers and in Wales on the establishment of a democratically elected Welsh Assembly. In an unusual move the referendums bill was introduced to the House of Commons by the then Prime Minister Tony Blair himself on 15 May 1997 just two weeks after the landslide Labour victory in the 1997 General Election and was the very first Bill to be presented to the Commons by the Blair Government of 1997-2007. The Act received royal assent on 31 July 1997 and became Spent upon the conclusion of both referendums.

Background

On 1 March 1979 voters in both Scotland and Wales voted in referendums on proposed Assembles under the provisions of the Scotland Act 1978 and the Wales Act 1978. The result in Scotland was a narrow "yes" by 51% of voters but failed to achieve an overall minimum 40% "yes" vote of the registered electorate and the motion failed to pass and in Wales the proposal was rejected outright by 79% of voters and political fallout from the results led to the fall of the Labour government 1974–79 which then led to Margaret Thatcher's victory in the 1979 UK General Election and the beginning of eighteen years of Conservative government.

The Act
The Act legislated for the holding of non-binding referendums to be held on 11 September 1997 in Scotland on whether there should be a democratically elected Scottish Parliament with tax varying powers and on 18 September 1997 in Wales on whether there should be a democratically elected Welsh Assembly and gave powers to both the Secretary of State for Scotland and the Secretary of State for Wales to enable the referendums to take place and gave them both the power to appoint Chief Counting Officers to oversee the referendums.

Franchise
The right to vote in the referendums in both Scotland and Wales applied to residents who were British, Irish and Commonwealth citizens as well as those who were entitled to vote in all local government elections including all resident EU citizens. Members of the House of Lords from both Scotland and Wales were also able to vote in the referendums. The minimum age for voters in both referendums was 18 years with polling stations open from 07:00 to 22:00 BST. In total almost 6.2 million people would be  eligible to vote across Scotland and Wales combined in the referendums.

Referendum in Scotland

The Act legislated for a referendum to be held across Scotland on 11 September 1997 on the establishment of a Scottish Parliament with tax varying powers. The  Secretary of State for Scotland under the act would appoint a Chief Counting Officer to oversee the referendum and also appoint local counting officers in each of the local government areas. Just under four million people were eligible to vote including EU nationals residing in Scotland.

Referendum questions
Under the Act the electorate was asked to vote on two sets of statements which corresponded to both proposals on different coloured ballot papers.

Question 1

On the first ballot paper the following appeared:

Parliament has decided to consult people in Scotland  on the Government's proposals for a Scottish Parliament:
I agree there should be a Scottish Parliament
or
I do not agree there should be a Scottish Parliament
(To be marked by a single (X))

Question 2

On the second ballot paper the following appeared:

Parliament has decided to consult people in Scotland on the Government's proposals for a Scottish Parliament to have tax-varying powers:
I agree that a Scottish Parliament should have tax-varying powers
or
I do not agree that a Scottish Parliament should have tax-varying powers
(To be marked by a single (X))

Counting areas
The 32 Scottish council areas were used as  the counting areas for the referendum under the provisions of the Act.

Question 1 Result

Every council area voted "I agree" to the proposed Scottish Parliament.

Question 2 Result

Votes in favour of tax-varying powers still commanded significant majority, when compared to establishing the Parliament per se. A majority voted 'I agree' in every local council, apart from in Dumfries & Galloway and Orkney.

Referendum in Wales

The Act legislated for a referendum to be held in Wales on 18 September 1997 on the establishment of a Welsh Assembly. The Secretary of State for Wales under the act would appoint a Chief Counting Officer to oversee the referendum and also appoint local counting officers. Almost two and a quarter million people were  eligible to vote including EU nationals residing in Wales.

Referendum question
On the  ballot paper the following appeared in both English and Welsh:

Parliament has decided to consult people in Wales on the Government's proposals for a Welsh Assembly:
Mae'r Senedd wedi penderfynu ymgynghori pobl yng Nghymru ar gynigion y Llywodraeth ar gyfer Cynulliad i Gymru:

I agree there should be a Welsh Assembly
Yr wyf yn cytuno dylid cael Cynulliad i Gymru
or
I do not agree there should be a Welsh Assembly
Nid wyf yn cytuno dylid cael Cynulliad i Gymru
(To be marked by a single (X))

Counting areas
The 22 Welsh council areas were used as  the counting areas for the referendum under the provisions of the Act.

Result

Note: In Wales under the Welsh Language Act 1993 the Welsh language has equal status with the English language.

Outcome
Following the results of both referendums the Scotland Act 1998 and the Government of Wales Act 1998 were both passed by the UK Parliament which  established both the Scottish Parliament and the Welsh Assembly and came into being following elections in both Scotland and in Wales in 1999.

See also
Referendums in the United Kingdom
1999 Scottish Parliament election
1999 National Assembly for Wales election

References

United Kingdom Acts of Parliament 1997
Referendums in Scotland
Referendums in Wales
Acts of the Parliament of the United Kingdom concerning Scotland
Acts of the Parliament of the United Kingdom concerning Wales
1997 in Scotland
1997 in Wales
Referendums in the United Kingdom